Operation Southern Focus was a period in the months leading up to the 2003 invasion of Iraq (called "Operation Iraqi Freedom" in the United States) in which the military responses to violations of the southern Iraqi no-fly zones were increased, with more intensive bombing of air defense artillery installations and other military complexes.  It also marked a period of increased intelligence gathering.  The operation lasted from June 2002 until the beginning of the invasion in March 2003.  It was intended to be a "softening up" period prior to invasion, degrading Iraq's air defense and communication abilities. Lieutenant General T. Michael Moseley revealed the operation's existence in mid-2003.

Operation
The operation was not publicly declared at the time, and was just said to be an intensification of the already-existing Operation Southern Watch.  When it began, the United States Defense Department and CENTCOM stated that increasing numbers of bombings of Iraqi installations in the region were merely in response to more attacks by the air-defense forces of that country.  The Iraqi no-fly zones had been patrolled continuously since the end of the 1991 Gulf War, and bombings by American and coalition fighter aircraft had taken place on a regular basis.  However, Southern Focus saw many more engagements.  Coalition forces responded to 651 attacks by dropping 606 bombs on 391 targets over the course of the operation.

Bombs usage
The tonnage of bombs dropped increased from 0 in March 2002 and 0.3 in April 2002 to between 7 and 14 tons per month in May–August, reaching a pre-war peak of 54.6 tons in September – prior to Congress' 11 October authorisation of the invasion. The September attacks included a 5 September 100-aircraft attack on the main air defence site in western Iraq. According to New Statesman this was "Located at the furthest extreme of the southern no-fly zone, far away from the areas that needed to be patrolled to prevent attacks on the Shias, it was destroyed not because it was a threat to the patrols, but to allow allied special forces operating from Jordan to enter Iraq undetected."

Success
Iraq's only success came on 23 December 2002, when a USAF RQ-1 Predator UAV was experimentally armed with AIM-92 Stingers and sent to patrol the no-fly zone in an attempt to bait Iraqi fighters into combat. It was spotted by two Iraqi MiG-23s and attacked, however both planes were unable to achieve a lock-on. A MiG-25 of the 1st Fighter-Interceptor Squadron was then scrambled to assist. Both aircraft fired missiles at each other, however, the Iraqi jet was outside of the range of the Stinger so the American missile fell short. The Iraqi missile hit the Predator, destroying it. This was the first time an unmanned aircraft had been used in air-to-air combat.

The first combat use of the U.S. Navys new F/A-18E Super Hornet fighter-bomber occurred in November 2002 during Operation Southern Focus, when aircraft from Strike Fighter Squadron 115 (VFA-115) flying from the aircraft carrier  struck surface-to-air missile sites and command and control targets near Al Kut.

See also

Downing Street memo
Operation Rockingham

References

Military operations involving Iraq
Aerial bombing operations and battles
2002 in Iraq
2003 in Iraq
Conflicts in 2002
Conflicts in 2003